Brett Young may refer to:

 Brett Young (Canadian football) (1967–2015), American player of Canadian football
 Brett Young (singer) (born 1981), American country singer-songwriter
 Brett Young (album), 2017
 Brett Young (EP), 2016
 Ace Young (Brett Asa Young, born 1980), American singer
 Francis Brett Young (1884–1954), English novelist, poet, playwright, and composer